The 1967–68 English football season was Aston Villa's 68th season in the Football League, this season playing in the Football League Second Division after relegation. Villa had been in decline for several years; the club had an ageing five-man board "who had failed to adapt to the new football reality". The club had neither developed a scouting network nor an effective coaching structure. The fans' calls for the board to resign became more and more pronounced when Villa finished 16th.

Tommy Cummings was appointed Aston Villa manager in the summer of 1967.

Brian Godfrey was transferred, with Brian Greenhalgh, from Preston North End in September 1967. Godfrey scored on his Villa debut, and he and Greenhalgh scored 18 goals between them in their first 17 games in Villa colours.

Second Division

References

External links
AVFC History: 1967-68 season

Aston Villa F.C. seasons
Aston Villa F.C. season